Tal Flicker (born 28 May 1992) is an Israeli judoka. He competes in the under 66 kg weight category, and won bronze medals in the 2017 World Judo Championships and the 2018 European Judo Championships as well as a silver medal in the 2020 European Judo Championships. Flicker won the 2017 Baku Grand Slam, 2017 Cancún Grand Prix and Abu Dhabi Grand Slam. In August 2017 he was ranked # 1 in the world in the U66 kg division.

Judo career

2011-16
In 2011, Flicker won the gold medal at the European Cup Under-20 in Paks, Hungary. He has won Israeli championships in 2011, 2012, 2014, and 2015.

On June 1, 2013, Flicker won his first international contest as a senior after defeating Ivan Spirin from Russia in the final of the European Open Bucharest. On September 12, 2014, he won a bronze medal in Zagreb Grand Prix, his first medal in a Grand Prix. In 2015 he won the European Open in Rome, and won bronze at the Jeju Grand Prix, South Korea. He then won bronze at the 2016 Zagreb Grand Prix.

2017-present
On March 10, 2017, Flicker won the gold medal at the Baku Grand Slam, after defeating Tomofumi Takajo from Japan in the final, and won another gold medal at the Cancún Grand Prix three months later. In 2017 he also won the European Open in Lisbon, and won bronze at the Düsseldorf Grand Prix.

On August 29, 2017, Flicker won a bronze medal at the 2017 World Judo Championships in Men's 66 kg in Budapest, Hungary. Flicker reached the semi-final where he lost to Mikhail Pulyaev of Russia, and then in the bronze medal contest he beat European champion Georgii Zantaraia of Ukraine by a waza-ari. He followed in the footsteps of fellow Israeli Golan Pollack, who won a World Championships bronze medal in the U66 category as well, two years prior. He became the fourth Israeli man in history to win the bronze, the others being Oren Smadja, his trainer, and Arik Zeevi, who won in the open-weight category. In August 2017 he was ranked # 1 in the world in the U66 kg division.

On October 26, 2017, Flicker won a gold medal at Abu Dhabi Grand Slam in the United Arab Emirates after defeating world championchips bronze medalist Nijat Shikhalizada of Azerbaijan with an ippon. The International Judo Federation (IJF) had sent a letter to the President of the United Arab Emirates Judo Federation that instructed: "all delegations, including the Israeli delegation, shall be treated absolutely equally in all aspects, without any exception," and that the IJF statutes "clearly provide that the IJF shall not discriminate on the ground of race, religion, gender or political opinion."

However, despite Ficker's win, and against the explicit instructions of the International Judo Federation, as they had done in the same event two years prior tournament organizers in Abu Dhabi refused to fly the Israeli flag or play the Israeli national anthem, despite the fact that it is customary to play the medalist's national anthem. In addition, instead of having "ISR" by his names on the scoreboard and on his back to denote that he was competing for Israel, at the insistence of the organizers "IJF" (for the International Judo Federation) was substituted. Oren Smadja said, after Flicker's victory: "I am very happy to be here - with a flag, without a flag ... to prove to everyone that it is impossible to stop the State of Israel." Arab and Muslim nations and athletes often boycott, or refuse to shake hands with, Israeli competitors.

On April 26, 2018, Flicker took part in the European Championships in Tel Aviv and won a bronze medal in the under 66 kg weight category. In the first round he defeated Nathon Burns of Ireland by waza-ari, in the second round he defeated Vadim Bunescu of Moldova by ippon. In the quarter finals he lost to Adrian Gomboc of Slovenia. He went on to defeat João Crisóstomo of Portugal in the repechage and reached the bronze medal match where he defeated Marko Gusic of Montenegro by ippon.

Titles
Source:

See also
Arash Miresmaeili Controversy
Islam El Shehaby Controversy

References

External links

 
 
 Tal Flicker at the European Judo Union
 

1992 births
Living people
Israeli male judoka
People from Herzliya